Iberville was a city in the Montérégie region of the Canadian province of Quebec on the east side of the Richelieu River, across from Saint-Jean-sur-Richelieu. It was about 30 miles (50 km) from Montreal, and about the same distance from the United States border at the head of Lake Champlain. In 2002, Iberville merged with neighbouring Saint-Jean-sur-Richelieu, along with several other neighbouring towns and villages.

The population of Iberville in 2006 was 9,989, up 6% from the 2001 census.

The last mayor of Iberville was Jean Rioux, who later became a Liberal MNA in the National Assembly of Quebec and a Liberal MP in the House of Commons of Canada.

Education

The South Shore Protestant Regional School Board previously served the municipality.

References

External links
 Iberville official website  (Archive)

Former municipalities in Quebec
Saint-Jean-sur-Richelieu
Communities in Montérégie
Populated places disestablished in 2002
2002 disestablishments in Quebec